T-1152 is a quaternary carbamate anticholinesterase. It is synthesized by reaction of m-dimethylaminophenol with methyl isocyanate, followed by quaternization with methyl iodide. Since T-1152 is toxic by ingestion, it was patented as a rodenticide in 1932.

The chloride and methylsulfate salt of T-1152 is T-1690 (TL-1226) and AR-13, respectively.

See also 
Neostigmine
T-1123
TL-599
TL-1238

References 

Carbamate nerve agents
Acetylcholinesterase inhibitors
Aromatic carbamates
Phenol esters
Quaternary ammonium compounds
Iodides
Rodenticides